John "Jack" Harper was a Grey Cup champion and All-Star Canadian Football League player. He was a halfback.

Harper started out with the Hamilton Tigers of the Ontario Rugby Football Union and had an All-Star season in 1948, leading his union in scoring with 60 points and tying Virgil Wagner for the national title. The Montreal Alouettes signed him, and fellow All-Star quarterback Frank Filchock, away from Hamilton in 1949 and these two stars were at the heart of the Als first ever Grey Cup victory that season.  After 3 more seasons in Montreal, Harper played with the Saskatchewan Roughriders for two seasons, and finished his career with 6 games for the Toronto Argonauts in 1955.

References

1927 births
Year of death missing
Montreal Alouettes players
Saskatchewan Roughriders players
Toronto Argonauts players
Hamilton Tigers football players
Players of Canadian football from Ontario
Ontario Rugby Football Union players